Harlthorpe is a hamlet in the East Riding of Yorkshire, England.
It lies on the A163 road.

It forms part of the civil parish of Foggathorpe.

In 1823 Harlthorpe (then Harlethorpe), was in the parish of Bubwith and the Wapentake of Harthill. Population at the time was 93, with occupations including six farmers, a blacksmith, and a 
shoemaker.

References

Villages in the East Riding of Yorkshire